Liverpool is a city and port in Merseyside, England, which contains many listed buildings.  A listed building is a structure designated by English Heritage of being of architectural and/or of historical importance and, as such, is included in the National Heritage List for England.  There are three grades of listing, according to the degree of importance of the structure.  Grade I includes those buildings that are of "exceptional interest, sometimes considered to be internationally important"; the buildings in Grade II* are "particularly important buildings of more than special interest"; and those in Grade II are "nationally important and of special interest".  Very few buildings are included in Grade I — only 2.5% of the total.  Grade II* buildings represent 5.5% of the total, while the great majority, 92%, are included in Grade II.

Liverpool contains more than 1,550 listed buildings, of which 28 are in Grade I, 109 in Grade II*, and the rest in Grade II.  This list contains the Grade II listed buildings in the L17 postal district of Liverpool.  The district lies to the south of the city centre, and much of it developed in the 19th century as an area where the prosperous merchants and businessmen of the city built their mansions.  Its centrepiece is Sefton Park, which is designated by English Heritage at Grade I in the Register of Historic Parks and Gardens.  The park contains a number of buildings listed at Grade II, including the lodges and entrances, statues, shelters, a bandstand, drinking fountains, and grottos.  The roads encircling the park, especially Mossley Hill Drive and Ullet Road, contain listed houses originally built for the merchants.  Also in the district is Fulwood Park, a private estate developed from 1840, which also includes listed mansions.  Other listed buildings in the district include a church, a bank, a bridge, and a public house.

Grade II listed buildings from other areas in the city can be found through the box on the right, along with the lists of the Grade I and Grade II* buildings in the city.

Buildings

See also

 Architecture of Liverpool

References and notes
Notes

Citations

Sources

External links
 Liverpool City Council listed buildings information page

Buildings in Liverpool 17
Listed buildings in Liverpool 17
Liverpool-related lists